The 1915 Western State Normal Hilltoppers football team represented Western State Normal School (later renamed Western Michigan University) as an independent during the 1915 college football season.  In their ninth season under head coach William H. Spaulding, the Hilltoppers compiled a 5–1 record and outscored their opponents, 291 to 43. Tackle Bob McKay was the team captain.

Schedule

References

Western State Normal
Western Michigan Broncos football seasons
Western State Normal Hilltoppers football